LG V20 is an Android phone manufactured by LG Electronics, in its  LG V series, succeeding the LG V10 released in 2015. Unveiled on September 6, 2016, it was the first phone with the Android Nougat operating system. Like the V10, the V20 has a secondary display panel near the top of the device that can display additional messages and controls, and a quad DAC for audio. The V20 has a user-replaceable battery, unlike its successor, the LG V30, unveiled on 31 August 2017.

Specifications 
The LG V20 was released in 2016 as LG's second V-series flagship smartphone. Its list of specifications includes the Qualcomm Snapdragon 820 system-on-chip, 4GB of RAM and 64GB of storage, 5.7-inch Quad HD (2560×1440) IPS LCD with additional secondary display, dual 16MP (75°, f/1.8) + 8MP (135°, f/2.4) rear cameras, 5MP (120°, f/1.9) front-facing camera, and a 3,200mAh removable battery.

Hardware 
The LG V20 continues the user-friendly hardware access design of the LG G5, having a removable back chassis of aluminum alloy for a significantly streamlined and convenient battery removal as well as easy access to internal components for any repairs, with polycarbonate plastic top and bottom caps, a USB-C connector compliant with Qualcomm's Quick Charge 3.0, and a rear-mounted power button with an integrated fingerprint reader. It is available in Dark Grey (named "Titan"), Pink, and Silver color finishes. The V20 features a 5.7-inch 1440p IPS LCD display with up to 500 nits of brightness, coated in Gorilla Glass 4, utilizing the Qualcomm Snapdragon 820 processor with 4 GB of LPDDR4 RAM. The device includes 64 GB of internal storage, expandable via microSD card up to 2TB, and a 3,200 mAh removable battery. The removable aluminum alloy cover, as well as the removable battery, is designed to act as shock and impact dissipation in the event that the V20 is dropped, in which case both will pop out from the main body and absorb the impact, dispersing the weight over the battery and cover, leaving the main components and screen less affected by drop damage compared to other smartphones. This makes the LG V20 one of the most drop shock resistant, durable and resilient consumer smartphones currently available. Similar to the V10, a second, supplemental display is located at the top of the device to the right of the 120° wide-angle front-facing camera. The secondary separate display can be used to show notifications, access controls, and apps, as well as display time and incoming messages. Both screens were made larger and brighter than those found on the V10.

Additional features include an IR blaster, FM radio, a dedicated 24-bit high fidelity audio recorder able to record up to 24-bit/192 kHz with manual channel controls for effective noise elimination of up to 50% in audio/video recording compared to other smartphone audio recorders, Bluetooth 4.2, NFC, as well as dual sim support for the H990N/H990DS international versions which doesn't take the microSD card slot like in most other dual sim supported smartphones. The V20 shipped with Bang & Olufsen H3 in-ear headphones for a limited time, and the phone's audio specifications and sound is tuned by the same company in some countries, including the international variants (indicated by the B&O logo on the back of the cover). Every model of the V20 includes the dedicated ESS Sabre ES9218 32-bit Hi-Fi Quad DAC, able to drive up to 600 ohm headphones to enhance wired headphones sound output quality with specifications of 130 dB SNR, 124 dB DNR and -112 dB THD+N. The LG V20 is currently the most powerful smartphone to have a removable battery.

Videos can be recorded with FLAC (lossless) audio tracks.

Software 
The V20 ships with Android 7.0 Nougat and LG UX 5.0+ software. It was the first Android device to ship with Nougat. Updates to Android 8.0 Oreo for various models were released, but later versions are not supported. 

LG support unlocking the bootloader of some phones, allowing them to be rooted and custom ROM images to be installed if available. There is no LG support for unlocking the V20 bootloader; it is reported to be possible, but difficult and with the risk of damaging the phone, and custom ROM images such as LineageOS have been unofficially produced.

Unique features 
The V20 released with a strong combination of features, including user-replaceable battery, higher quality audio than the competition and strong camera hardware and software. It also had an infrared (IR) blaster that allowed it to control televisions and other remote controlled devices. 

As part of its focus on audio and video, it had several strong points. It was one of the few phones at the time with an ultrawide camera, as well as laser autofocus. It had high acoustic overload point(AOP) microphones that allowed recording in very loud concert settings. It also had configurable bitrate video and audio recording, with lossless audio and steerable sound focus and waveform display while recording.

As of Q1 2021, the V20 remains the only phone with a user-replaceable battery, DAC audio, 3.5mm headphone jack and IR transmitter. The phone developed a cult following, despite the bloatware and lack of an easily unlocked bootloader.

References

External links 

 
 
 Phone specifications
 Measured technical specifications of the ESS Sabre ES9218 32-bit DAC
 Audiophile DAC
 Reddit community discussion

LG Electronics smartphones
LG Electronics mobile phones
Mobile phones introduced in 2016
Android (operating system) devices
Mobile phones with multiple rear cameras
Mobile phones with user-replaceable battery
Mobile phones with 4K video recording
Discontinued smartphones
Mobile phones with infrared transmitter